"Stepping Stone" is a song by American rapper Eminem from his album Kamikaze (2018). It charted in Australia, Canada, Sweden, and the US.

Background
"Stepping Stone" describes the fallout of D12, a rap group of which Eminem was formerly a part of. He also uses the song to confirm that the group will no longer be continuing due to the death of Proof.

Personnel
Eminem – lead vocals, production
Luis Resto – additional production, keyboards
Mario Resto – additional vocals

Charts

References

2018 songs
Songs written by Luis Resto (musician)
Songs written by Eminem
Eminem songs